Sulphide Creek is a creek in the Moira River and Lake Ontario drainage basins in Tweed, Hastings County and Addington Highlands, Lennox and Addington County in Ontario, Canada.

Course
It flows generally southwest almost immediately into Tweed, Hastings County, through a series of lakes and takes in several unnamed tributary creeks. It flows near the communities of Hungerford and Otter Creek to the community of Sulphide. Stoco Lake flows via the Moira River into the Bay of Quinte in downtown Belleville.

See also
List of rivers of Ontario

References

Rivers of Hastings County
Rivers of Lennox and Addington County